Djehutihotep ("Thoth is satisfied") was an ancient Egyptian nomarch of the fifteenth nomos of Upper Egypt ("the Hare") during the twelfth dynasty, c. 1900 BC.

Biography 

Djehutihotep lived under the reigns of Amenemhat II, Senusret II, and Senusret III and was one of the most powerful nomarchs of the Middle Kingdom. His tomb—the only one among the necropolis of Deir el-Bersha that wasn't damaged by the explosives used in recent quarrying methods—is well known for the great quality of its decorations, a work carried out by an artist named Amenaankhu. For this reason, it is believed that Djehutihotep died prior to the strict measures reducing the power of the nomarchs that were established by Senusret III. Indeed, as their charge became hereditary at the end of the Old Kingdom, the nomarchs became local rulers effectively, although not nominally, independent of the pharaohs. This situation led to excesses in the exercise of power that worsened steadily during the First Intermediate Period. It was not until Senusret's measures were imposed that such abuse of power later exercised by nomarchs, stopped posing a threat to the integrity of the Egyptian state.

Being part of the hereditary nomarch system, Djehutihotep's family held the office of local governor for several generations. Djehutihotep was the son of a woman named Satkheperka and an official named Kay. The latter was the brother of Djehutynakht VI and Amenemhat, both of whom became governors of the Hare nome, although Kay did not. Djehutihotep was married to a woman named Hathorhotep. Her parents are not recorded in known sources. Several children of Djehutihotep are known. See "Nomarchs of the Hare nome" for further notes about his genealogy.

Two limestone jambs from Djehutihotep's tomb entrance are now on display in the National Archeological Museum of Florence (inv. nos. 7596 and 7597), having been purchased by Ernesto Schiaparelli in 1891–92. The jambs list his several civil and religious titles, which include Treasurer of the King, Unique friend (of the King), Overseer of the priests, and Great overlord of the Hare nomos (i.e. nomarch). Djehutihotep was represented at the bottom of the jambs.

The “colossus on a sledge”
Unfortunately, no traces of this colossus have ever been found. The colossus' depiction itself was irremediably vandalized and destroyed in 1890, and all the existing drawings are based on a single photo taken the previous year by a certain Major Brown.
It is assume a rate of 5% of water ease the transport by up to around 30%.

References

Further reading 
Percy Newberry, El Bersheh, part I: The tomb of Tehuti-hetep, London, 1891.
 

Officials of the Twelfth Dynasty of Egypt
Nomarchs
Colossal statues
Ancient Egyptian royal sealers